The Voice of Ireland is an Irish reality talent show. It began airing on 8 January 2012. It replaced The All Ireland Talent Show.  The Voice of Ireland aired on RTÉ One. Kathryn Thomas presented the main show, while Eoghan McDermott co-presented. Bressie, Kian Egan, Sharon Corr and Brian Kennedy were the coaches. Pat Byrne, mentored by Bressie, won the series.

Auditions for this series took place at the end of 2011. The Blind Auditions took place at The Helix, Dublin, between 26 and 31 October in front of a live audience. On Thursday, 24 November and Friday, 25 November, each coach's artists performed at The Helix for The Battle Rounds. The Live Shows began on 4 March. This series included Lucy O'Byrne, who would later appear as runner-up on the British series of The Voice.

Teams
 Winner
 Runner-up
 Third place
 Fourth place
 Eliminated in the Live shows
 Eliminated in the Battles

Blind Auditions
The Blind Auditions took place at The Helix, Dublin, between 26 and 31 October in front of a live audience. The coaches choose teams of artists through a blind audition process. Each coach has the length of the artists' performance to decide if they want that artist on their team. Should two or more coaches want the same artist, then the artist gets to choose their coach.  Once the coaches have picked their team, they are to pit them against each other in the ultimate sing off; The Battles.

Color key
 Coach hit his/her "I WANT YOU" button
 Artist defaulted to this coach's team
 Artist elected to join this coach's team
 Artist eliminated with no coach pressing his or her "I WANT YOU" button

Blind Auditions 1

Blind Auditions 2

Blind Auditions 3

Blind Auditions 4

Blind Auditions 5

Battles
On Thursday, 24 November and Friday, 25 November, each coach's artists performed at The Helix for The Battle Rounds. Each team of artists were mentored and developed by their coach. In this stage, two artists from the same team, battle against each other by singing the same song, with the coach choosing which artist to send through to the live shows.

Color key
 Artist won the Battle and advances to the Live shows
 Artist lost the Battle and was eliminated

Battles 1

Battles 2

Battles 3

Live shows
The Live Shows began on 4 March. The remaining artists competed against each other in live TV broadcasts at The Helix, with the viewers helping decide who advances and who exits the competition. When one artist remains for each coach, the artists will compete against each other in the finale on 29 April. The winner of the show will become The Voice of Ireland and get offered a contract with Universal Music worth €100,000.

Results summary
Artist's info

Result details

Live show details
 Artist was saved by the public's vote
 Artist was part of the bottom group in his/her team and saved by his/her coach
 Artist was eliminated

Live Show 1 (4 March)
Guest performer: Royseven ("We Should Be Lovers")
Teams competing: Team Bressie and Team Brian

Live Show 2 (11 March)
Coaches performance: "Wake Up" (Performed by all four coaches)
Guest performer: Bressie ("Breaking My Fall")
Teams competing: Team Sharon and Team Kian

Live Show 3 (18 March)
Guest performer: Rizzle Kicks ("Mama Do the Hump")
Teams competing: Team Brian and Team Bressie 
Team performance: Brian Kennedy and Team Brian ("Life Love and Happiness")

Live Show 4 (25 March)
Guest performer: Pixie Lott ("Kiss the Stars")
Teams competing: Team Kian and Team Sharon
Team performance: Sharon Corr and Team Sharon ("Sweet Dreams (Are Made of This)")

Live Show 5 (1 April)
Guest performer: Olly Murs ("Oh My Goodness")
Teams competing: Team Bressie and Team Brian
Team performance: Bressie and Team Bressie ("All Day and All of the Night")

Live Show 6 (8 April)
Guest performer: Brian Kennedy ("Best Days")
Teams competing: Team Kian and Team Sharon
Team performance: Kian Egan and Team Kian ("More Than Words")

Quarter-Final (15 April)
Guest performer: The Coronas ("Mark My Words")
Teams competing: Team Bressie, Team Brian, Team Kian, and Team Sharon

Semi-final (22 April)
Guest performers: Professor Green ("Remedy") and Maverick Sabre ("Let Me Go")
Teams competing: Team Bressie, Team Brian, Team Kian, and Team Sharon

On 22 April 2012, the final four were announced based on a mix of Public's vote and voting of coaches. Both carried equal weight of 100 points for a total of 200 points. The coaches delivered their points in closed envelopes at the end of the live semi-final round. After counting of the Public's votes and adding the coaches', the Final 4 were: Vanessa Whelan, Richie Hayes, Jim Devine, and Pat Byrne, who moved on to the final. The song they performed this week was then available to download on iTunes and each download counted as a vote for the final.

Final (29 April)
Guest performer: Alexandra Burke ("Let It Go")
Teams competing: Team Bressie, Team Brian, Team Kian, and Team Sharon
Group performance: The finalists & coaches ("Pride (In the Name of Love)") and The finalists ("A Little Less Conversation")

Ratings

References

External links
 The Voice of Ireland – a behind the scenes look with Hello!

1
2012 Irish television seasons